Emil Larsson may refer to:

Emil Larsson (film maker) (born 1979), Swedish film director and film producer
Emil Larsson (ice hockey) (born 1993), Swedish ice hockey player

See also
Emil Larsen (born 1991), Danish footballer
Emil Larsen (wrestler) (1888–1942), Danish wrestler